The Premier League of Eswatini, also known as the MTN Premier League due to sponsorship reasons, is the top division of the Eswatini Football Association. It was created in 1971 and plans to be a fully professional entity by 2022.

2021–22 MTN Premier League clubs 
Denver Sundowns
Green Mamba
Malanti Chiefs 
Manzini Sea Birds
Manzini Wanderers
Mbabane Highlanders
Mbabane Swallows
Milling Hotspurs
Moneni Pirates 
Rangers
Royal Leopards
Tambankulu Callies 
Tambuti
Tinyosi
Vovovo
Young Buffaloes

Previous winners

1971 : Milling Hotspurs
1972 : Milling Hotspurs
1973 : not known
1974 : Mbabane Highlanders
1976 : Mbabane Highlanders
1977 : Juventus Kvaluseni (Mhlume)
1980 : Mbabane Highlanders
1981 : Mhlume Peacemakers (Mhlume)
1982 : Mbabane Highlanders
1983 : Manzini Wanderers
1984 : Mbabane Highlanders
1985 : Manzini Wanderers
1986 : Mbabane Highlanders
1987 : Manzini Wanderers
1988 : Mbabane Highlanders
1989 : Denver Sundowns (Manzini)
1990 : Denver Sundowns (Manzini)
1991 : Mbabane Highlanders
1992 : Mbabane Highlanders
1993 : Mbabane Swallows
1994 : Eleven Men in Flight (Siteki)
1995 : Mbabane Highlanders
1996 : Eleven Men in Flight (Siteki)
1997 : Mbabane Highlanders
1998 : no championship
1998–99 : Manzini Wanderers
1999–00 : Mbabane Highlanders
2000–01 : Mbabane Highlanders
2001–02 : Manzini Wanderers
2002–03 : Manzini Wanderers
2003–04 : Mhlambanyatsi Rovers
2004–05 : Mbabane Swallows
2005–06 : Royal Leopards
2006–07 : Royal Leopards
2007–08 : Royal Leopards
2008–09 : Mbabane Swallows
2009–10 : Young Buffaloes
2010–11 : Green Mamba
2011–12 : Mbabane Swallows
2012–13 : Mbabane Swallows
2013–14 : Royal Leopards
2014–15 : Royal Leopards
2015–16 : Royal Leopards
2016–17 : Mbabane Swallows
2017–18 : Mbabane Swallows
2018–19 : Green Mamba
2019–20 : Young Buffaloes
2020–21 : Royal Leopards
2021-22 : Royal Leopards

Performance by club

Top scorers

References

External links
MTN Premier League Official Website
Premier League of Eswatini at fifa.com
RSSSF competition history

Football leagues in Eswatini
Eswatini
Sports leagues established in 1976
1976 establishments in Swaziland